Vopiscus may refer to:

 Vopiscus (praenomen), a Latin praenomen, or personal name
Vopiscus Julius Iulus, a Roman consul in 473 BC
Gaius Julius Caesar Strabo Vopiscus (c. 130 — 87 BC), an orator and tragedian
Marcus Manilius Vopiscus, a Roman consul in AD 60
Lucius Pompeius Vopiscus, a Roman consul in AD 69 
Publius Manilius Vopiscus Vicinillianus, a Roman consul in AD 114
Flavius Vopiscus, one of the 4th century authors of the Historia Augusta